Jane Anderson  (born 23 December 1952) is a British physician who specialises in the management of HIV/AIDS. She has served as an expert advisor for Public Health England and is Chair of the National AIDS Trust

Early life and education 
Anderson was born in Swindon, Wiltshire on 23 December 1952. She originally trained as a nutritionist at Queen Elizabeth College. In an interview with The BMJ Anderson revealed that as a teenager she had underperformed in her A-levels and had initially not secured a place at medical school. Eventually she was accepted as a mature student to St Mary's Hospital Medical School. She started work as a research assistant in a metabolic unit. Anderson started her professional career in the 1980s, in the early days of the AIDS epidemic.

Research and career 
Anderson was a Visiting Fellow at King's Fund. She has dedicated her career to improving the long-term health outcomes of people living with HIV. In the early nineties Anderson joined Barts and The London, where she worked as a consultant physician, and held a joint position at Homerton University Hospital. Anderson serves as Director of the Homerton University Hospital NHS Foundation Trust Centre for the Study of Sexual Health and HIV. In 2005 she presented evidence before the government, arguing that long-stay visitors to the United Kingdom, undocumented people and those refused indefinite leave to remain should not be charged for HIV care.

Anderson has held various senior public health positions in the United Kingdom, including leading the Public Health England HIV, Sexual and Reproductive Health in the Wellbeing Directorate from 2013 to 2016. In 2021 she was elected Master of the Worshipful Society of Apothecaries. In 2016 Anderson was made Chair of the National AIDS Trust. Anderson has served as the co-chair of the London Fast Track Cities Initiative since 2018.

Awards and honours 

 2012 Appointed Chair of the British HIV Association
 2014 100 Leading Ladies
 2015 Appointed Commander, Order of the British Empire
 2016 Appointed Chair of the National AIDS Trust.

Select publications 
Recommendations for defining preventable HIV-related mortality for public health monitoring in the era of Getting to Zero: an expert consensus. Croxford SE, Martin V, Lucas SB, Miller RF, Post FA, Anderson J, Apea VJ, Asboe D, Brough G, Chadwick DR, Collins S. The Lancet HIV. 2023 Jan . retrieved 8th February 2023 
Consensus statement on the role of health systems in advancing the long-term well-being of people living with HIV. Lazarus JV, Safreed-Harmon K, Kamarulzaman A, Anderson J, Leite RB, Behrens G, Bekker LG, Bhagani S, Brown D, Brown G, Buchbinder S. Nature communications. 2021 Jul 16;12(1):4450. Retrieved 8 February 2023.
4.

References 

1952 births
Living people
20th-century British medical doctors
21st-century British medical doctors
British women medical doctors
Commanders of the Order of the British Empire